Ritu Raj is an entrepreneur based in California. Raj is the founder of Avasta, OrchestratorMail and Objectiveli, as well as Wag Hotels, a chain of luxury hotels for dogs and cats.

Education and early career 
Ritu Raj graduated from Kirori Mal College at Delhi University, and worked for IT consulting firms in Delhi before moving to the US in 1994. Upon his arrival in the US, he worked for a small startup, AT Systems, and was later an executive with TMP Worldwide.

Chapter 2/Avasta 

In 1999, Raj founded Chapter 2, an application service provider (ASP) that supports the business applications for companies as an outsourcing company running the companies' existing networks. The company based its name on the idea that chapter one of the internet was web site hosting, with chapter two being business application hosting. In 2000 the company secured $9.5 million in funding. That year they also opened offices that provided back-office operations, security management and call center operations services. As of 2001, the company had raised $50 million from investors. That year Chapter 2 was renamed Avasta - a name based on the Sanskrit word "vasta," meaning "to stand and remain" - in order to reflect the company's new services. In 2003, Avasta was acquired by NaviSite.

Wag Hotels 
Following Avasta, Raj was a partner with the information technology consulting firm Accenture. He was away from home and his dog frequently. This was the inspiration behind his venture Wag Hotels, a California-based line of luxury hotel for dogs and cats. In 2005, Wag opened its first location in West Sacramento. The company also operates Wag Store, a hotel-affiliated store. In 2007, Wag opened a location in San Francisco. In June 2007, the company also bought a stake in the Modesto-based pet quarterly publication, Wag Magazine.

Other Ventures 
In 2010, Raj co-founded OrchestratorMail, and serves as the company's CEO. An application that works on top of an existing user's email platform, OrchestratorMail organizes email into a set of categories. Users then use this differentiation to determine what emails to reply to first.

From 2011-2012, Raj was an Entrepreneur in Residence at Spring Ventures, LLC, a venture capital firm in San Francisco. While there, he helped launch SideCar, a ride-sharing app that connects drivers with people looking for rides. In exchange, passengers can give drivers a financial donation. The apps were initially banned, however new regulations have since allowed them to operate.

In 2012, Raj co-founded Objectiveli with Jonathan Yankovich. Objectiveli is a web application designed for companies to set and manage objectives and goals and track the outcomes in real-time.

References

External links 
 Wag Hotels
 OrchestratorMail
 Objectiveli

Living people
Businesspeople from California
People from Delhi
Delhi University alumni
American people of Indian descent
Year of birth missing (living people)